Arapov is a Slavic masculine surname, its feminine counterpart is Arapova. It may refer to
Alexis Arapoff, (1904–1948), Russo-Franco-American painter, also Arapov
Alexei Arapov (1906–1943), Soviet military officer
Boris Arapov (1905–1992), Russian composer
Dmitri Arapov (born 1993), Russian football player 
Georgy Arapov (born 1999), Russian politician 
Mate Arapov (born 1976), Croatian sailor

See also
Arapov's contracture, a pain reflex

Russian-language surnames